Chantal Reuter (born 5 May 1978) is a Dutch former professional tennis player.

Born in Amsterdam, Reuter won the girls' doubles title at the 1994 US Open (with Surina De Beer).

Reuter, a right-handed player, competed briefly on the professional tour in the early 1990s, where she won three ITF singles titles and reached a best ranking of 408 in the world.

ITF finals

Singles: 3 (3–0)

References

External links
 
 

1978 births
Living people
Dutch female tennis players
Tennis players from Amsterdam
US Open (tennis) junior champions
Grand Slam (tennis) champions in girls' doubles
20th-century Dutch women
20th-century Dutch people
21st-century Dutch women